Nanthild (c. 610 – 642), also known as Nantéchilde, Nanthechilde, Nanthildis, Nanthilde, or Nantechildis, was a Frankish queen consort and regent, the third of many consorts of Dagobert I, king of the Franks (629–639). She was regent during the minority of her son from 639 until 642.

Life
She was of Saxon lineage, born about 608 or 610. The Lexikon des Mittelalters calls her ein Mädchen aus dem Dienstpersonal ("a maiden of the royal [ Austrasian ] household"). Her elevation to consort may have given importance to her relatives: her brother Lanthegisel was an important landowner in the  Limousin and a relation of Aldegisel. Dagobert set aside his wife Gomatrud to marry her, ca. 629; to her was born Clovis II, second eldest of Dagobert's surviving sons and the one who succeeded him in Neustria and Burgundy.  After Dagobert's death in January 639, she was initially regent for her son, accompanied by Aega, mayor of the Neustrian palace and an opponent of the powerful contingent of nobles headed by Burgundofaro whose seat was at Meaux.

In the interest of reducing noble Burgundian independence of the Merovingian palace, she married her niece Ragnoberta to the Frank Flaochad and had the magnates and bishops of the realm of Burgundy acclaim him mayor of the palace at Orléans in 642. Soon she died at Landry in what was then Burgundy, where she had long resided; her body was translated to the Saint Denis Basilica. It is likely that she was poisoned or secretly murdered, as her untimely death allowed her son to fall under the influence of the nobility, who abhorred a strong royal hand.

References

Fredegar's Chronicle, book IV
Geary, Patrick J.,  1998. Before France and Germany: The Creation and Transformation of the Merovingian World (Oxford & New York: Oxford University Press) 
Wood, Ian,  1994. The Merovingian Kingdoms. 450-751  (London)
Lexikon des Mittelalters vol. VI.1018

610 births
642 deaths
Burials at the Basilica of Saint-Denis
7th-century women rulers
Merovingian dynasty
Queen mothers
Frankish queens consort
Burgundian queens consort
Regents of France
7th-century Frankish women
7th-century Frankish nobility